The history of Hinduism in Madagascar began with the arrival of primarily Gujarati from the Saurashtra region of India as far back as 1870. These were predominantly Muslim (Khojas, Ismailis and Daoudi Bohras), but a small number were Hindus.

Current status
The International Religious Freedom Report 2006 reported that there is a small Hindu presence in Madagascar. Many of them are business owners, or IT professionals who have lived in the country for generations. The majority speak Hindi or Gujarati, although some other Indian languages are spoken. Nowadays, younger generations speak at least three languages, including French or English, Gujarati and Malagasy.

References

External links
Hindu Associations in Madagascar

Religion in Madagascar
Madagascar
Madagascar